The 2014 Winmau World Masters was a major tournament on the BDO/WDF calendar for 2014. It took place from 9–12 October, with 9 October played at the Bonus Arena for the non-stage matches, and 10–12 October played at the Hull City Hall, which hosted the stage element of the event for the fourth year.

Stephen Bunting was unable to defend his title due to his switch to the PDC. Deta Hedman attempted to defend the title she won in 2013 as the number 1 seed.  Maud Jansson defeated her 4–2 in the last 64 though. Another seed that was knocked out before the Quarter-finals was Lorraine Winstanley who lost 1–3 in the last 16 to Lisa Ashton.  Anastasia Dobromyslova ended up winning the competition by defeating Fallon Sherrock 4–1 in the final. In the men's final Martin Phillips defeated Jamie Hughes 7–3.

In the girls competition 17-year-old Robyn Byrne defeated 10-year-old Beau Greaves 4–0 in the final. In the boys competition Colin Roelofs defeated Callan Rydz 4–1 in the final.

Seeds

Men 
The seedings were finalised on completion of the 2014 French Open and the 2014 Scottish Classic on 30 August. For the third consecutive year, there are 32 seeds (an increase from 8 between 2007–2011) with the Top 16 exempt until the Last 32 stage.
  James Wilson
  Martin Adams
  Alan Norris
  Scott Mitchell
  Glen Durrant
  Jamie Hughes
  Robbie Green
  Martin Phillips
  Wesley Harms
  Gary Robson
  Jeffrey de Graaf
  Ross Montgomery
  Rick Hofstra
  Remco van Eijden
  Scott Waites
  Darryl Fitton
  Jan Dekker
  Tony O'Shea
  Madars Razma
  Geert De Vos
  Darius Labanauskas
  Pip Blackwell
  Sam Head
  Garry Thompson
  Sam Hewson
  Paul Jennings
  Paul Coughlin
  Brian Dawson
  Richie George
  Jim Williams
  Michel van der Horst
  Dave Smith

Women 
The seedings were finalised on completion of the 2014 French Open and the 2014 Scottish Classic on 30 August. The ladies seeds enter at the start of the competition however can not play each other until the quarter final stage.
  Deta Hedman
  Anastasia Dobromyslova
  Aileen de Graaf
  Trina Gulliver
  Rachel Brooks
  Lorraine Winstanley
  Zoe Jones
  Fallon Sherrock

There were no seedings in the boys or girls events.

Men's Draw
Last 32 onwards.

Sets are best of 3 legs.

Ladies Draw
Last 8 onwards.

Boys Draw

Last 8 onwards.

Girls Draw

Last 8 onwards.

Television coverage
Eurosport showed the final session of play of the event across Europe.

References

World Masters
World Masters
World Masters
Sport in Kingston upon Hull
2010s in Kingston upon Hull